FK Bohumín is a Czech football club, playing in the town of Bohumín. The club was founded in 1931. The club spent two years in the Czech 2. Liga, from the 1993–94 to the 1994–95 season. It currently plays in the fourth division (group F), at the fourth tier of Czech football.

Club's name
 1931 AFK Nový Bohumín
 1948 AFK Baňská a hutní Bohumín
 1949 TJ BŽGK Bohumín
 1953 TJ Baník BŽGK Bohumín
 1958 TJ ŽD Bohumín
 1993 FC ŽD Bohumín
 1994 FC Dipol Bohumín
 1994 FC Coring Bohumín
 1996 SK Bohumín
 199? ŽD Bohumín
 2006 FK Bohumín
 2015 FK Bospor Bohumín   PasakH

External links

References

 Jindřich Horák, Lubomír Král: Encyklopedie našeho fotbalu. Sto let českého a slovenského fotbalu. Domací soutěže. Libri, Prague 1997.
 Radovan Jelínek, Miloslav Jenšík et al.: Atlas českého fotbalu od roku 1890. Prague 2005. 
 Výbor FO TJ ŽDB (Hrsg.): 50 let fotbalového oddilu TJ ŽDB. Železárny a drátovny n.p. Bohumín, 1981.

Football clubs in the Czech Republic
Association football clubs established in 1931
Karviná District